Lamontville is a town in EThekwini in the KwaZulu-Natal province of South Africa.

Township south of Durban, on the Umlaas River and next to Mobeni. It was laid out in 1930 and named after the Revd Archibald Lamont, then Mayor of Durban.

References

Populated places in eThekwini Metropolitan Municipality
Townships in KwaZulu-Natal